Senator Perez may refer to:

 Aníbal Marrero Pérez (1949–2005), Senate of Puerto Rico
 Joaquin A. Perez (1916–1984), Senate of Guam